The Song of the Earth: A Natural History of Music is a BBC documentary presented by David Attenborough and written and directed by Grant Sonnex. It was first transmitted in 2000 and is part of the Attenborough in Paradise and Other Personal Voyages collection of 7 documentaries.

References

From DVD

External links

BBC television documentaries
Documentaries about music